The 2017 Gimcheon Open ATP Challenger was a professional tennis tournament played on hard courts. It was the fourth edition of the tournament which was part of the 2017 ATP Challenger Tour. It took place in Gimcheon, Korea between 1 and 7 May 2017.

Point distribution

Singles main-draw entrants

Seeds

 1 Rankings are as of April 24, 2017.

Other entrants
The following players received wildcards into the singles main draw:
  Chung Yun-seong
  Hong Seong-chan
  Kim Cheong-eui
  Lee Jea-moon

The following player received entry into the singles main draw using a protected ranking:
  Yuki Bhambri

The following player received entry into the singles main draw as a special exempt:
  Juan Pablo Paz

The following players received entry from the qualifying draw:
  Liam Broady
  Hubert Hurkacz
  Austin Krajicek
  Bradley Mousley

Champions

Singles

  Thomas Fabbiano def.  Teymuraz Gabashvili 7–5, 6–1.

Doubles

  Marco Chiudinelli /  Teymuraz Gabashvili def.  Ruan Roelofse /  Yi Chu-huan 6–1, 6–3.

References

Gimcheon Open ATP Challenger
Gimcheon Open ATP Challenger
2017 in South Korean tennis